Baghdasht or Bagh Dasht or Bagh-e Dasht may refer to:
 Bagh Dasht, Fars
 Baghdasht, Gilan
 Bagh Dasht, Mazandaran
 Baghdasht, Qazvin